Echo is a former settlement in Inyo County, California.

It was located on the crest of the Funeral Mountains above Death Valley, halfway between Lee and Schwaub.

Echo never had any buildings, only tents which workers of the Inyo Gold Mining Company would set up and disassemble, although a telephone line between Lee and Schwuab cut through the town. Echo was not to last as more profitable prospects could not be found in the area. A few items remain of the town, including a pair of former tent sites and can dumps as well as some shattered glass.

The site of Echo is within Death Valley National Park.

References

History of the Mojave Desert region
Former settlements in Inyo County, California
Populated places in the Mojave Desert
Former populated places in California
Death Valley National Park